Jakob August Isaksson (16 June 1886, Uudenkaupungin maalaiskunta - 11 July 1929) was a Finnish journalist and politician. He was a member of the Parliament of Finland from 1924 until his death in 1929, representing the Socialist Electoral Organisation of Workers and Smallholders. He was the editor of Österbottens Folkblad, Folkbladet and Nya Folkbladet.

References

1886 births
1929 deaths
People from Uusikaupunki
People from Turku and Pori Province (Grand Duchy of Finland)
Swedish-speaking Finns
Socialist Electoral Organisation of Workers and Smallholders politicians
Members of the Parliament of Finland (1924–27)
Members of the Parliament of Finland (1927–29)